Olga Kozičová (25 June 1951 – 26 January 2016) was a Slovak swimmer. She competed at the 1968 Summer Olympics in the 100 m and 200 m individual freestyle and finished in eighth place in the latter event.

References

1951 births
2016 deaths
Slovak female freestyle swimmers
Czechoslovak female swimmers
Slovak female swimmers
Olympic swimmers of Czechoslovakia
Swimmers at the 1968 Summer Olympics
Sportspeople from Bratislava
20th-century Slovak women
21st-century Slovak women

Olga trained with the Santa Clara Swim Club for two weeks in 1968.